Welltree Station is a pastoral lease that operates as a cattle station in Northern Territory.

Location
It is located adjacent to Litchfield National Park. Part of the Anson Bay, Daly and Reynolds River Floodplains, an Important Bird and Biodiversity Area is found within the station boundaries.

History
In 1961 Welltree was bought by Bob Townshend for 9 million. He put the property on the market in 2001 when it was stocked with 9,000 head of Brahman cattle and comprised , of which 60 percent is made up of floodplain country. The floodplain supports a mixture of olive hymenachne, para and rice grasses. The higher country has been planted with various grasses and legumes. The property has been divided into 29 separate paddocks which are well watered by two large permanent lagoons and six bores.

R. M. Williams Agricultural holdings acquired both Labelle Downs and Welltree aggregation at the top of the market in 2009 from cattleman Peter Camm in 2009. The company went into receivership in 2013 with PPB Advisory being appointed as the receiver and manager of all the properties in the companies portfolio.

R. M. Williams Agricultural holdings sold the property, along with Labelle Downs, to Australian Agricultural Company in 2013 for 27 million.

See also
List of ranches and stations

References

 
Pastoral leases in the Northern Territory 
Stations (Australian agriculture)